Tissot SA is a Swiss watchmaker. The company was founded in Le Locle, Switzerland by Charles-Félicien Tissot and his son, Charles-Émile Tissot, in 1853. After several mergers and name changes, the group which Tissot SA belonged to was renamed the Swatch Group in 1998.

Tissot is not associated with Mathey-Tissot, another Swiss watchmaking firm.

History

Independent company 
Tissot was founded in 1853 by Charles-Félicien Tissot and his son Charles-Émile Tissot in the Swiss city of Le Locle, in the Neuchâtel canton of the Jura Mountains area. The father and son team worked as a casemaker (Charles-Félicien Tissot) and watchmaker (Charles-Emile). His son having expressed an interest in watchmaking from a young age. The two turned their house at the time into a small 'factory'. Charles-Emile Tissot left for Russia in 1858 and succeeded in selling their savonnette pocket watches across the Russian Empire.

In 2021, the company is marketing Le Locle Powermatic 80, which has a watch face designed to mimic the clock tower in its founding city of Le Locle. The name Le Locle seems to be a reliable ingredient of success. As well as being the name of Tissot's home and heritage, nestled in the Swiss Jura Mountains, it is the name of a hugely popular automatic watch family.

Omega, SSIH, ASUAG, SMH
Tissot merged with watch company Omega SA in 1930, forming SSIH (Société Suisse pour l'Industrie Horlogère), and Tissot-Omega watches from this era are sought after by collectors.

Tissot's first engagement as an official timekeeper was in 1938 where they timed a series of ski races in Villars-sur-Ollon, near the company's home town in the Jura mountains. Tissot was used for timing downhill skiing in Switzerland in 1938, and for the Davis Cup in 1957.

SSIH-ASUAG was formed in 1983 (Allgemeine Schweizerische Uhrenindustrie Aktiengesellschaft, ASUAG, was a holding company supplying the watch industry), then SMH (Société Suisse de Microélectronique et
d’horlogerie; 1983–1985).

Swatch subsidiary 
SMH took the name of the Swatch Group in 1998. Tissot SA remained in Le Locle, Switzerland, and marketed in 160 countries. Tissot watches are classified by the Swatch Group as "mid-range market" products.

Tissot is an official timekeeper for the world championships in cycling, motorcycling, fencing and ice hockey, etc. Tissot was a sponsor for the Formula One car-racing teams Lotus, Renault, and Sauber. In the past handheld stopwatches were sufficient to provide official timings; in more recent times manufacturers and sporting bodies together develop more accurate systems for specific events. In competitive cycling, for instance, sensors are placed on the bikes and track, and linked by computers to provide track timings and performance data.

Motto and slogan 
The company motto/slogan of Tissot is "Innovators by Tradition" and its mission statement is "gold value at silver price".

Watch manufacturing

Notable inventions 
Tissot introduced the first mass-produced pocket watch as well as the first pocket watch with two time zones in 1853 and the first anti-magnetic watch, in 1929–30. Tissot was also one of the first companies to manufacture an antimagnetic wristwatch in the early 1930s. The Tissot company was also the first to make watches out of plastic (Idea 2001 in 1971), stone (the Alpine granite RockWatch in 1985), mother of pearl (the Pearl watch in 1987), and wood (the Wood watch in 1988).

Tissot introduced its first tactile watch, with "T-Touch," technology in 1999; watches containing this technology have touch-sensitive sapphire crystals to control various functions including compass, barometer, altimeter and thermometer. The 2014 T-Touch Expert Solar and T-Touch Lady Solar had 25 functions.

Gallery

Marketing
Tissot has partnered with a wide range of celebrities from basketball players, actors, cricket players, to MotoGP racers to be their brand ambassadors. Tissot brand ambassadors have included: Tony Parker, Liu Yi Fei, Virat Kohli, Deepika Padukone, Huang Xiaoming, Jorge Lorenzo, Thomas Lüthi, Neha Kakkar, Marc Márquez and Rana Daggubati.

Clientele 
Tissot watches have been worn by the Princess of Wales, Sarah Bernhardt, singer Carmen Miranda, Grace Kelly, Elvis Presley, and Nelson Mandela.

In popular culture

James Stewart wore a Tissot watch in Rear Window. T-Touch watches have been worn by Angelina Jolie in the movies Lara Croft Tomb Raider: The Cradle of Life and Mr. & Mrs. Smith.  Simon Pegg wore a T-Touch in Mission: Impossible - Rogue Nation.. Richard Roundtree appears to wear a Tissot PR 516 with steel rally bracelet in Shaft.

Sponsorships 
Tissot has been the official timekeeper responsible for timing in several sports including MotoGP, the International Ice Hockey Federation, the Union Cycliste Internationale, the International Basketball Federation (FIBA), the International Fencing Federation, the Women's National Basketball Association, for many years. In basketball it has sponsored the Swiss national team, the Chinese Basketball Association, the NBA and other related events, teams, and organizations. On November 20, 2019, it was announced that Tissot would serve as the official timekeeper and results service for the 2022 World Games.

See also 

 List of watch manufacturers
 Swiss Made

References

External links 

 

The Swatch Group
1853 establishments in Switzerland
Swiss companies established in 1853
Manufacturing companies established in 1853
Le Locle
Swiss watch brands
Watch manufacturing companies of Switzerland
Companies based in the canton of Neuchâtel